Xanthochroa is a genus of false blister beetles in the family Oedemeridae. There are about seven described species of Xanthochroa.

Species
These seven species belong to the genus Xanthochroa:
 Xanthochroa californica Horn, 1874
 Xanthochroa centralis Horn, 1896
 Xanthochroa erythrocephala (Germar, 1824)
 Xanthochroa lateralis (Melsheimer, 1846)
 Xanthochroa marina Horn, 1896
 Xanthochroa testacea Horn, 1896
 Xanthochroa trinotata LeConte, 1866

References

Further reading

 
 
 
 
 
 
 

Oedemeridae